The 2014–15 Fordham Rams women's basketball team represented Fordham University during the 2014–15 NCAA Division I women's basketball season. Stephanie Gaitley served as head coach for a fourth consecutive season. The Rams were members of the Atlantic 10 Conference and played their home games at the Rose Hill Gymnasium. They finished the season 21–12, 11–5 in A-10 play to finish in fourth place. They advanced to the semifinals of the A-10 women's tournament where they lost to George Washington. They were invited to the Women's National Invitation Tournament where they defeated Central Connecticut in the first round before losing to St. John's in the second round.

2014–15 media

Forham Rams Sports Network
Forham Rams games will be broadcast on WFUV Sports and streamed online through the Fordham Portal with Kenny Ducy and Matt Moro providing the call. Most home games will also be featured on the A-10 Digital Network. Select games will be televised.

Roster

Schedule

|-
!colspan=9 style="background:#880038; color:#FFFFFF;"| Exhibition

|-
!colspan=9 style="background:#FFFFFF; color:#880038;"| Regular Season

|-
!colspan=9 style="background:#880038; color:#FFFFFF;"| Atlantic 10 Tournament

|-
!colspan=9 style="background:#880038; color:#FFFFFF;"| WNIT

Rankings
2014–15 NCAA Division I women's basketball rankings

See also
 2014–15 Fordham Rams men's basketball team
 Fordham Rams women's basketball

References

Fordham Rams women's basketball seasons
Fordham